Prostitution is illegal in Iran, and incurs various punishments ranging from fines and jail terms to execution for repeat offenders.

History
The exact number of prostitutes working in Iran is unknown, but in 2017 it was estimated that there were 228,700 prostitutes in Iran and that the number was on the rise.

Prostitutes are visible on some street corners of the major cities. Many of them are runaways from poor and broken homes. In 2002, the moderate Iranian newspaper Entekhab estimated that there were close to 85,000 prostitutes in Tehran alone. Prostitution is rampant in Tehran; "the streets are full of working girls ... part of the landscape, blending in with everything else."

Police raids have also exposed child prostitution rings. An Iranian psychiatrist, Mahdis Kamkar, believes the rise in prostitution is a symptom of broader social problems, among them "troubled families, divorce, identity crises and social contradictions."

Before the Iranian Revolution in 1979, prostitutes were confined to separate neighborhoods such as Shahr-e No in Tehran. The new religious government demolished the district and punished prostitution with lashing. Establishing brothels is also a criminal act, subject to 1–10 years imprisonment, if not subject to death sentence.

Prostitution scandal
In 2008, General Reza Zarei, the Tehran police chief, was arrested in a brothel with six prostitutes. His arrest caused embarrassment for the government of President Ahmadinejad  because Zarei was in charge of vice in Tehran. The prosecutor in the case remarked that Zarei exploited his office to profit materially from prostitution.

Nikah mut‘ah or Sigheh 

While prostitution is illegal in Iran, the Shiah institution of Nikah mut‘ah (temporary marriage, usually called Sigheh in Iran) allows contractual short-term relations between both sexes. Usually, a dowry is given to the temporary wife. Sigheh can last from 3days to 99 years (although some Islamic scholars (mujtahids), say that it is impossible to marry a person, as temporary marriage, for a period of time that is usually longer than the average life-time of a person);<ref>Resaaleye Daneshjouyi; Porsesh-ha va Pasokh-ha. Motaabeghe Nazar-e 10 Tan az Maraaje'e Ezaam. رساله دانشجویی؛ پرسش ها و پاسخ ها. مطابق نظر ده تن از مراجع عظام. Ma'aaref Publication. Student's Risalah. Questions and Answers. Compatible with the Fatwa of Ten People of Marja's. . p 223.</ref> it expires automatically without divorce. According to a number of scholars and Iranians, Sigheh is being misused as a legal cover for prostitution in Iran.Haeri, Shahla (1989). Law of Desire: Temporary Marriage in Shi'i Iran. Contemporary Issues in the Middle East. Syracuse University Press. p. x. . "Outside of the religious establishment and the ongoing disputes between Shi'i and Sunni scholars, the attitude toward temporary marriage has been primarily one of ambivalence and disdain. Before the revolution of 1979, the secular Iranian middle classes dismissed temporary marriage as a form of prostitution that had been legitimized by the religious establishment, who, to use a popular Persian expression, 'put a religious hat on it.'" Religious people argue that Islamic temporary marriage is different from prostitution for a couple of reasons, including the necessity of iddah in case the couple have sexual intercourse. It means that if a woman marries a man in this way and has sex, she has to wait for a certain period of time before marrying again and therefore, a woman cannot marry more than a limited number of times in a year. It has been reported that the number of temporary marriages entered into is on the increase.

 Special Healthcare and Screening Centers 
On 15 July 2016, Ali Akbar Sayyari'', the healthcare affairs' Deputy Minister of the Ministry of Health and Medical Education of Iran, informed the public about improving and/or establishing (depending on the area and place in the country) 'drop-in centers' and 'voluntary counseling and testing' centers for the female sex workers. These centers provide disease prevention tools and examine the sex workers for STDs. They also provide counselling.

2016 Estimation 
According to Farahnaz Salimi, head of Aaftaab Society, an NGO for social damages controlling and prevention, there are about 10,000 female sex workers in Tehran. Among these sex workers, there are married women or female clerks, too. According to her reports, the average price of having sex with sex workers is 600,000 rials (60,000 tomans which is about US$14.28). The price can be as high as some hundred thousand tomans (= some million rials) for a night. The lowest price is 50,000 rials (= 5,000 tomans). (Price information is based on currency exchange rates of spring 2016).

Sex trafficking

Iran is a source, transit, and destination country for men, women, and children subjected to sex trafficking. Organized groups reportedly subject Iranian women, boys, and girls to sex trafficking in Iran, Afghanistan, the Iraqi Kurdistan Region (IKR), Pakistan, United Arab Emirates (UAE), and Europe. Some Iranian women, who seek employment to support their families in Iran, are vulnerable to sex trafficking. Iranian girls between the ages of 13 and 17 are targeted by traffickers for sale abroad; younger girls may be forced into domestic service until their traffickers consider them old enough to be subjected to child sex trafficking. In 2016, there was a reported increase in young Iranian women in prostitution in Dubai; some of these women may be trafficking victims. From 2009 to 2015, the transport of girls from and through Iran en route to other Persian Gulf states for sexual exploitation reportedly increased. Iranian girls were subjected to sex trafficking in brothels in the IKR, especially Sulaimaniya; in some cases this exploitation was facilitated by Iranian trafficking networks. In 2015, the media reported Kurdistan Regional Government officials were among the clients of these brothels. In Tehran, Tabriz, and Astara, the number of teenage girls exploited in sex trafficking reportedly continues to increase. Afghan migrants and refugees, including children, are highly vulnerable to sex trafficking.

In 2007, the United States State Department placed Iran as a "Tier 2" in its annual Trafficking in Persons reports, stating that "it does not fully comply with the minimum standards for the elimination of trafficking but is making significant efforts to do so". In 2010, U.S. Secretary of State Hillary Clinton downgraded Iran to "Tier 3", noting that the country makes no significant effort to solve trafficking problems, mainly in relation to prostitution and forced labor.

Foreign female victim
Chinese, Thai, and other foreign women are forced to engage in prostitution under the acquiescence of religious leaders in Iran.

See also
 Chastity House
 Crime in Iran
 Healthcare in Iran
 Prostitution in Asia

References

External link

 
Society of Iran
Women's rights in Iran